, born Minoru Tanaka, was a Japanese actor best known for his various roles in kaiju films produced by Toho, often portraying scientists or military personnel.

Career

Tanaka began his career as a traveling stage actor in the 1930s, performing under both his birth name and various stage names. In 1950, he changed his name to Jun Tazaki when he appeared in Shintoho's film Sasameyuki. After initially holding only small film roles, Tazaki gradually gained popularity and began playing larger roles in films produced by Toho in the 1960s. Akira Kurosawa frequently cast Tazaki in his films, but Ishirō Honda also considered him a favorite. Toho's science fiction films, particularly those directed by Honda, featured him throughout the 1960s as an authority figure with a moustache. As well as playing stern but benevolent father figures, Tazaki played villains with a ruthless streak. His defining role came in Honda's Atragon, in which he portrayed the embittered World War II veteran Hachiro Jinguji, forced to engage the submarine Gotengo, to combat an invasion by the underwater-dwelling Muans. In the 1970s, Tazaki stopped taking science fiction roles, but he continued to act until 1985, when he died of lung cancer.

Selected filmography

Film

 1948: Nikutai no mon
 1949: Enoken no kentokyo ichidai ki
 1950: Sasameyuki – Yonekichi Itakura, the photographer
 1950: Kimi to yuku America kôro
 1950: Banana musume
 1950: Akatsuki no tsuiseki
 1950: Yoru no hibotan – Yoshioka
 1950: Mittsu no kekkon
 1950: Tokyo File 212
 1951: Wakasama samurai torimonochô: noroi no ningyôshi
 1951: Kaizoku-sen
 1951: Takaharu no eki yo sayônara
 1951: Bungawan soro
 1951: Kanketsu Sasaki Kojirô: Ganryû-jima kettô – Matabê Takada
 1952: Okuni to Gohei – Iori, Okuni's husband
 1952: Ukigumo nikki
 1952: Rikon – Kensaku – Tazaki
 1952: Shimizu no Jirocho den
 1952: Geisha warutsu
 1952: Jirochô sangokushi: nagurikomi kôjinyama
 1953: Chinsetsu Chûshingura
 1953: Jirochô sangokushi: Jirochô hatsutabi
 1953: Oyabaka hanagassen
 1953: Koibito-tachi no iru machi – Michita Kuraishi
 1953: Kinsei mei shôbu monogatari: Hana no Kôdôkan – Ryûkichi Kimura
 1953: Haresugata: Izu no Satarô
 1953: Jirochô sangokushi: Jirochô to Ishimatsu
 1953: Daibosatsu Tôge - Dai-san-bu: Ryûjin no maki; Ai no yama no maki – Yonetomo
 1953: 
 1953: Hakucho no kishi
 1953: Gate of Hell – Kogenta
 1953: Jirochô sangokushi: nagurikomi kôshûji
 1954: Jirochô sangokushi: hatsu iwai Shimizu Minato
 1954: Koina no Ginpei – Tsumeki no Unokichi
 1954: Jirochô sangokushi: kaitô-ichi no abarenbô
 1954: Jirochô sangokushi: Kôjinyama zenzen
 1954: Konomura Daikichi – Genzaburo
 1954: Banchô sara yashiki: Okiku to Harima
 1955: Meiji ichidai onna – Minokichi
 1955: Mekura neko
 1955: Gerô no kubi – Nohei, vassal
 1955: Gyakushu orochimaru
 1955: Akagi no chi matsuri
 1956: Abare andon
 1956: Shachô santôhei
 1956: Tekketsu no tamashii
 1956: Shujinsen
 1956: Kage ni ita otoko – Hachigorô
 1956: Toyamâ kin-san torimonô-cho-kage ni ita otoko
 1956: Gunshin Yamamoto gensui to Rengô kantai
 1957: Arashi no naka no otoko – Karate expert
 1957: Onna dake no machi
 1957: Fûun kyû nari Ôsaka jô: Sanada jûyûshi sô shingun – Yukimura Sanada
 1957: Kyôfu no dankon
 1957: Kaidan iro zange: Kyôren onna shishô – Nizô
 1957: Shukujo yokawa o wataru
 1957: Ippon-gatana dohyô iri – Yahachi
 1957: Shizukanaru otoko
 1957: Yoru no kamome
 1958: Ohtori-jo no hanayome – Higaki
 1958: Ankoru watto monogatari utsukushiki aishu – Rickshaw
 1958: The Loyal 47 Ronin – Ikkaku Shimizu
 1958: Tabi wa kimagure kaze makase
 1958: Okon no hatsukoi hanayome nanahenge
 1958: Nora neko
 1958: Onna-za murai tadaima sanjô
 1959: Hitohada botan
 1959: Kagerô-gasa – Tajima Sakamoto
 1959: Onna to kaizoku - Yasu
 1959: Kogan no misshi
 1959: Moro no Ichimatsu yûrei dochu
 1959: Bôfûken – Kawakami
 1959: The Three Treasures – Ootomo's Kurohiko
 1959: Edo no akutaro – Heisuke
 1959: Koi yamabiko
 1959: Kêisatsû-kan to bôryôku-dan
 1960: The Last Gunfight – Otokichi Kozuka
 1960: Hawai Middowei daikaikûsen: Taiheiyô no arashi – Captain
 1960: The Demon of Mount Oe
 1960: Aoi yaju – Ogawa
 1960: Man Against Man – Boss Tsukamoto
 1960: Ôzora no yarôdomo
 1960: 'Akasaka no shimai' yori: yoru no hada – Jôji Akui
 1961: The Story of Osaka Castle as Teikabo Tsutumi – Teikabo Tsutsumi
 1961: Zenigata Heiji torimono hikae: Yoru no enma chô
 1961: 'Nendo no omen' yori: kaachan
 1961: Kaoyaku akatsukini shisu
 1961: Kasen chitai – Shigemune
 1961: Zoku shachô dochuki: onna oyabun taiketsu no maki
 1961: Kurenai no umi
 1961: Jigoku no kyôen – Kanzaburo Itami
 1961: Witness Killed – Ichiro
 1961: Hoero datsugokushu
 1962: Gorath - Raizô Sonoda – Tomoko's father
 1962: Doburoku no Tatsu – Kakibetsu
 1962: Owari Jurocho ikka-Sanshita nicho kenju
 1962: Dobunezumi sakusen
 1962: Star of Hong Kong – Dr. Matsumoto
 1962: Nippon musekinin jidai - Mr. Kuroda
 1962: King Kong vs. Godzilla - General Masami Shinzo
 1962: Sanbyakurokujugoya
 1962: Yama-neko sakusen
 1962: Chūshingura: Hana no Maki, Yuki no Maki – Kiken Murakami
 1962: Ankokugai no kiba
 1963: Attack Squadron! – Commander
 1963:  – Kamo Serizawa
 1963: Nippon jitsuwa jidai
 1963: High and Low – Kamiya, National shoes publicity director
 1963: Sengoku yarô
 1963: Chintao yôsai bakugeki meirei
 1963: Yojinbô ichiba
 1963: Nippon ichi no iro otoko
 1963: Hiken
 1963: Norainu sakusen
 1963: The Lost World of Sinbad – Itaka Tsuzuka of the Imperial Guards
 1963: Atragon - Captain Hachiro Jinguji
 1964: Zoku shachô shinshiroku
 1964: Kyô mo ware ôzora ni ari
 1964: Mothra vs. Godzilla – Maruta, Chief editor
 1964: 
 1964: Hadaka no jûyaku – Imaizumi, Executive
 1964: Chi to daiyamondo – Utsuki
 1964: Dogara, the Space Monster – chief inspector
 1964: 
 1964: Kokusai himitsu keisatsu: Kayaku no taru – Dr. Tatsuno
 1964: Hana no oedo no musekinin
 1964: Kwaidan – Kannai's colleague #1 ("Chawan no naka" segment)
 1965: Taiheiyô kiseki no sakusen: Kisuka – Akune
 1965: Frankenstein Conquers the World – Military advisor
 1965: Hana no o-Edo no hôkaibô – Gensui Matsui
 1965: Daiku taiheki
 1965: Baka to Hasami
 1965: Invasion of Astro-Monster – Dr. Sakurai
 1966: Musekinin Shimizu Minato
 1966: Izuko e
 1966: Bangkok no yoru – Dr. Yamawaki
 1966: Kiganjô no bôken – Innkeeper
 1966: Jigoku no nora inu
 1966: War of the Gargantuas – Army commander
 1966: Godzilla vs. The Sea Monster – Red Bamboo commander
 1966: Abashiri Bangaichi: Koya no taiketsu
 1967: The Killing Bottle – President of Buddabal
 1967: Abashiri bangaichi: Kettô reika 30 do – Nagamamushi, a miner
 1967: Japan's Longest Day – Captain Yasuna Kozono – CO 302nd Air Group
 1967: Otoko no shobu: kantô arashî
 1967: Abashiri Bangaichi: Aku eno Chôsen – Gôzô Kadoma
 1968: Zoku otoshimae – Kuroda
 1968: Destroy All Monsters – Dr. Yoshida
 1968: Wakamono yo chôsen seyo
 1968: Wasureru monoka
 1968: Kûsô tengoku – Boss
 1969: Battle of the Japan Sea – Shimaji Hashiguchi
 1969: Kiki kaikai ore wa dareda?! – Kumagorô Izawa
 1970: Mekurano Oichi inochi moraimasu – Nadaaan
 1970: Nippon ichi no yakuza otoko
 1970: Botan to ryu
 1976: Osharé daisakusen
 1977: Hakkodasan
 1977: Sanshiro Sugata
 1978: Hakatakko junjô – Takeichi, Takeshi's dad
 1981: Kaettekita wakadaishô
 1981: The Imperial Navy
 1983: Shōsetsu Yoshida gakkō – Ono
 1985: Ran – Seiji Ayabe (final film role)

Television
 1965: Taikōki
 1966: Minamoto no Yoshitsune
 1966: Ultra Q – Director General Sakamoto
 1969: Ten to Chi to – Takeda Nobutora
 1973: Kunitori Monogatari
 1973: Jumborg Ace
 1974: Kamen Rider X – Professor Keitarou Jin (Keisuke's father)
 1983: Tokugawa Ieyasu – Shimazu Yoshihiro

References

1913 births
1985 deaths
Japanese male actors